Theme to the Gaurdian is the debut album by American jazz guitarist Bill Connors. It was recorded in 1974 and released by ECM Records.

Critical reception
The Allmusic review by John W. Patterson awarded the album four stars stating, "this release of Connors is truly excellent acoustic guitar work with some of the most unique compositions and playing style you will find anywhere. Connors dubs one track as a sort of complex and exotic chordal progression base structure of strummed rhythms and/or a tapestry of finger roll picking. Over this landscape of dreamy, moody, surreal or frenetic design Connors solos and augments the original track of his playing. The effect is a ghostly dance of melancholy angst and passionate wailings".

Track listing

Personnel
 Bill Connors – guitar

References

ECM Records albums
Bill Connors albums
1975 debut albums
Albums produced by Manfred Eicher
Instrumental albums